Rotkäppchen is an East German film based on the fairy tale Little Red Riding Hood. It was released in 1962, and sold 5,769,400 tickets.

References

External links
 

1962 films
1960s fantasy films
German fantasy films
German children's films
East German films
Films based on Little Red Riding Hood

Films based on fairy tales
1960s German films